Epikeratophakia  (also known as epikeratoplasty and onlay lamellar keratoplasty) is a refractive surgical procedure in which a lamella of a donor cornea is transplanted onto the anterior surface of the patient's cornea. A lamellar disc from a donor cornea is placed over the de-epithelialized host cornea and sutured into a prepared groove on the host cornea. Indications include treatment of keratoconus, refractive errors like myopia and high hypermetropia including aphakia, which cannot be corrected with conservative methods.


Complications 
Common complications of epikeratophakia include delayed post operative visual recovery, reduced best corrected visual acuity, prolonged epithelial defects and irregular astigmatism.

History 
In 1949, José Barraquer introduced refractive procedure of inclusion of a lenticule within the corneal stromal layer. In 1980s, based on Barraquer's procedure, Werblin, Kaufman and Klyce at the LSU Eye Center introduced epikeratophakia.

References

Eye surgery